Taghi Riahi (1911–1989) was an Iranian senior military officer in the Iranian Imperial Army.

Biography
Riahi was born in Chaleshtar in 1911. He graduated from the Academy of Arts in Tehran. Then he attended the officer's college and was sent to France for further studies in mechanics and military sciences together with a group of students. Following graduation he joined the Imperial Army. In 1952 he was promoted to the rank of brigadier general.

He was named as Chief of Staff of the Army appointed by Prime Minister Mohammad Mossadegh replacing Mahmoud Baharmast in the post. His tenure lasted from 1 March to 19 August 1953 when a coup d'état occurred. From the New York Times:

The operation, the secret history says, "still might have succeeded in spite of this advance warning had not most of the participants proved to be inept or lacking in decision at the critical juncture." Dr. Mossadegh's chief of staff, Gen. Taghi Riahi, learned of the plot hours before it was to begin and sent his deputy to the barracks of the Imperial Guard. The deputy was arrested there, according to the history, just as pro-shah soldiers were fanning out across the city arresting other senior officials.

Although Riahi was sentenced to death, he was released from the prison after three years. Then he involved in business.

After the revolution, Riani left Iran and settled in France. However, upon the request of Mehdi Bazargan who led the interim government Riani returned to Iran and took office as the minister of national defence for a short time. Following the end of his tenure Riani went to France and died in Nice in 1989.

References

External links

20th-century Iranian businesspeople
20th-century Iranian politicians
1911 births
1989 deaths
Defence ministers of Iran
École Spéciale Militaire de Saint-Cyr alumni
Imperial Iranian Army brigadier generals
Islamic Republic of Iran Army brigadier generals
National Front (Iran) politicians